Walthour is a surname. Notable people with the surname include: 

Isaac Walthour (1930–1977), American basketball player
John B. Walthour (1904–1952), bishop of Atlanta, US
Margaret Walthour Lippitt (1872–1964), American artist
Robert Walthour (1878–1949), American cyclist